Murray Wayne Creed (born 5 March 1979) is a South African cricketer.  Creed is a right-handed batsman who bowls right-arm fast-medium.  He was born in Port Elizabeth, Cape Province.

Biography
Creed made his first-class debut for Eastern Province B against North West in the 1997/98 season.  Creed also played first-class cricket for the main Eastern Province team, playing 14 first-class matches for them from the 1998/99-2000/01 seasons, to add to the 4 he played for the B team in the 1997/98/1998/99 seasons.  Additionally, he played a single first-class match for a Border and Eastern Province Combined XI and 3 matches for the South Africa Academy.  In total he played 22 first-class matches, with his final one coming for Eastern Province against Free State in March 2001.  In his 22 career first-class matches, he scored 728 runs at a batting average of 25.10, with 3 half centuries and a high score of 72, while in the field he took 9 catches.  With the ball he took 18 wickets at a bowling average of 49.38, with best figures of 4/30.

It was for Eastern Province that he made his debut in List A cricket during the 1998/99 Standard Bank League against Border.  From the 1998/99 season to the 2000/01 season, he represented the Province in 30 List A matches, the last of which came against KwaZulu-Natal in February 2001.  In his 30 matches for the Province, he scored 383 runs at an average of 17.40, with a high score of 47, while in the field he took 6 catches.  With the ball he took 9 wickets at an average of 39.33, with best figures of 2/22.

He later represented the Nottinghamshire Cricket Board in 3 List A matches.  These against Bedfordshire in the 1st round of the 2001 Cheltenham & Gloucester Trophy, Oxfordshire in the 1st round of the 2002 Cheltenham & Gloucester Trophy which was played in 2002 and Cumberland in the 1st round of the 2003 Cheltenham & Gloucester Trophy which was played in 2002.  In his 3 matches for the Board, he scored 129 runs at an average of 43.00, with a single half century high score of 77.

References

External links
Murray Creed at Cricinfo
Murray Creed at CricketArchive

1979 births
Living people
Cricketers from Port Elizabeth
South African cricketers
Eastern Province cricketers
Nottinghamshire Cricket Board cricketers